Katie Hall may refer to:

Katie Hall (American politician) (1938–2012), American politician
Katie Hall (cyclist) (born 1987), American cyclist
Katie Hall (actress) (born 1990), British actress and soprano
Katie Hall (Australian politician), member of the Victorian Legislative Assembly